Steevens is an English surname, and may refer to:

 Charles Steevens (?–1761), British naval officer in the Siege of Pondicherry
 George Steevens (1736–1800), English Shakespearean commentator
 George Warrington Steevens (1869–1900), British journalist and writer
 Richard Steevens (1653–1710), physician, gave rise to Dublin's Dr Steevens' Hospital

See also
 Steeven
 Stevens

Surnames from given names